The Congdon Street Baptist Church is an historically African American church at 17 Congdon Street in the College Hill neighborhood of Providence, Rhode Island.

Description and history
The congregation was established in 1819, and originally met in a building located near the present site, which was torn down in 1869. The present building, a single-story Italianate structure, was built in 1874–75. The eaves and gables are decorated with sawn woodwork that resembles brick corbelling. The windows along the long sides of the building are tall sash windows with a segmented-arch top, while the street-facing gable end has a three-part round-arch window. The stages of the square tower repeat the corbel woodwork at each level. The church is set into a hill, exposing a full brick basement, through which entrance to the building is gained. The interior is decorated with plain Victorian woodwork and stencilling on the walls.

The architects were Hartshorn & Wilcox. Hartshorn was the successor of Thomas A. Tefft and this church echoes many of his designs.

In December 1968, 65 Black students from Brown University marched down College Hill to the Congdon Street Baptist Church. They remained in the church for three days, as a protest of the small number of Black students admitted to the University as well as a lack of institutional support.

The building was listed on the National Register of Historic Places in 1971 for its architectural significance, and is part of the College Hill Historic District

Gallery

See also
 National Register of Historic Places listings in Providence, Rhode Island

References

External links

 Congdon Street Baptist Church website

Baptist churches in Rhode Island
Churches on the National Register of Historic Places in Rhode Island
Churches completed in 1874
19th-century Baptist churches in the United States
African-American history of Rhode Island
Churches in Providence, Rhode Island
National Register of Historic Places in Providence, Rhode Island
Historic district contributing properties in Rhode Island